The San Pietro di Muralto Altarpiece or San Pietro degli Osservanti Altarpiece is a 1488-1489 tempera and gold on panel altarpiece by Carlo Crivelli and his studio, named after the Dominican church in Camerino in which it originally hung, and now divided between a number of American and European museums.

History

On 8 November 1483 the artist committed to paint a multi-panel altarpiece for Mariano Ronci as large and beautiful as the 1482 San Domenico di Camerino Altarpiece. The work was not produced quickly, but on 28 October 1488 he signed a contract with Ronci's heir Mariano Meneconi by which he was given a year to paint it in return for 100 florins paid in instalments.

The work had already been moved to the church of San Francesco in Camerino by the start of the 16th century after its original home was turned into a fort by Cesare Borgia's occupying forces. After an earthquake in 1799 destroyed or damaged several churches in the city, the work was moved to the church of San Domenico in the same town, from which it was looted by the French and moved with other masterpieces from the Marche to the Pinacoteca di Brera. On 14 February 1822, while reordering its collection, that museum's curators transferred it to Antonio Fidenza, who put it on the art market. It was sold by William Cunningham in London to Lord Dudley and later was acquired by the Gemäldegalerie in 1882. That main work, Madonna and Child Handing Saint Peter the Keys to Paradise, with Saints, is unsigned but on the basis of the documents and style is dated to the artist's final phase.

Panels

The main work features Saint Bonaventure, Francis of Assisi and Giovanni da Capestrano on the left and Louis of Toulouse, Saint Augustine and Blessed James of the Marches. As shown in 1961 by Federico Zeri, that work originally had a lunette of a Pietà with Mary Magdalene, John the Apostle and the Virgin Mary at the top (now in the Pinacoteca Vaticana in Rome) and a cornice of six small paintings showing seven saints, all of which was removed before it was taken to the Brera. Two of the frame panels showing Bonaventure and Bernard are also in the Gemäldegalerie, whilst the others are in the Bonnefantenmuseum in Maastricht (Dominic and Anthony of Padua), the Palazzo Colonna in Rome (Saint Augustine) and the Worcester Art Museum (a single panel showing both Bernardino and Catherine of Siena)

Bibliography
Pietro Zampetti, Carlo Crivelli, Nardini Editore, Firenze 1986. 
AA-VV., Gemäldegalerie Berlin, Prestel, 1998. ISBN 978-3-7913-4071-5

External links
 

Paintings by Carlo Crivelli
Paintings of Augustine of Hippo
Paintings depicting Saint Peter
Paintings of Saint Bonaventure
Paintings of Francis of Assisi
Paintings of Louis of Toulouse
Paintings of the Madonna and Child
Paintings of the Pietà
Paintings depicting John the Apostle
Paintings depicting Mary Magdalene
Paintings in the Gemäldegalerie, Berlin
Paintings in the Worcester Art Museum
Paintings in the collection of the Vatican Museums